Tsse may refer to:

 Tsse (Cyrillic) (Ꚑ ꚑ), a letter of the Cyrillic script
 TssE, a constituent protein in the baseplate of a Type VI secretion system